1999 Egypt Cup Final, was the final match of 1998–99 Egypt Cup, when Zamalek played Ismaily at Cairo Stadium in Cairo.

Zamalek won the game 3–1, claiming the cup for the 19th time.

Route to the final

Game description

Match details

External links

1999
Cup Final
EC 1999
EC 1999